Artyfechinostomum malayanum is a species of digenetic trematode in the family Echinostomatidae.

The known first intermediate host of Artyfechinostomum malayanum include freshwater snails Indoplanorbis exustus and Gyraulus convexiusculus.

The ceraciae can also infect gastropods Pila scutata, Lymnaea cumingiana and Digoniostoma pulchella.

References

Animals described in 1943
Plagiorchiida